Wilson Steven Haro Criollo (born 5 January 1998) is an Ecuadorian road cyclist, who currently rides for UCI Continental team . He competed in the road race at the 2021 UCI Road World Championships.

Major results
2016
 Pan American Junior Road Championships
7th Time trial
10th Road race
2017
 10th Overall Vuelta Independencia Nacional
2018
 6th Time trial, Pan American Under-23 Road Championships
2019
 1st Overall Vuelta Ciclista a Miranda
1st Young rider classification
 6th Overall Vuelta a Venezuela
 6th Overall Tour de l'Espoir
1st Mountains classification
 10th Road race, Pan American Under-23 Road Championships
2020
 9th Overall Vuelta al Ecuador
2021
 1st  Overall Vuelta al Ecuador
1st Stage 6 
 5th Road race, National Road Championships
2022
 6th Overall Vuelta a Formosa Internacional

References

External links

1998 births
Living people
Ecuadorian male cyclists